Jack Jackson may refer to:

Jack Jackson (radio personality) (1906–1978), British dance band trumpeter, bandleader and radio disc jockey
Jack Jackson (ice hockey) (1925–2015), retired Canadian professional ice hockey player
Jack Jackson (cartoonist) (1941–2006), American cartoonist known as Jaxon
Jack Jackson (American football) (born 1972), American football wide receiver
Jack Jackson Sr. (born 1933), American politician from Arizona
Jack Jackson (Missouri politician), American politician from Missouri and highly-decorated Marine Corps aviator
Jack Jackson Jr., American politician from Arizona
Jack Jackson (businessman), co-founder of Pep Boys

Jackie Jackson may refer to:
Jackie Jackson (born 1951), U.S. singer in the Jackson 5
Jackie Jackson (bassist) (born 1947), Jamaican bass player
Jumpin Jackie Jackson (1940-2019), former basketball and streetball player

See also 
Union Jack Jackson, fictional British comics character
Jack Jackson, a fictional character in the novel The Pillars of the Earth and its miniseries
John Jackson (disambiguation)